Toxaway Lake is an alpine lake in the western United States, in Custer County, Idaho.

A trail from the Yellow Belly Lake and Pettit Lake trailheads leads towards Toxaway Lake via Farley Lake. These trailheads can be accessed from State Highway 75 via Sawtooth National Forest road 208.

Toxaway Lake is in the Sawtooth Wilderness and wilderness permit can be obtained at trailheads.  Campfires in this section of the Sawtooth Wilderness are prohibited due to heavy use and limited firewood.

References

See also
 List of lakes of the Sawtooth Mountains (Idaho)
 Sawtooth National Forest
 Sawtooth National Recreation Area
 Sawtooth Range (Idaho)

Lakes of Idaho
Lakes of Custer County, Idaho
Glacial lakes of the United States
Glacial lakes of the Sawtooth Wilderness